is the railway station in Nagayo, Nishisonogi District, Nagasaki Prefecture, Japan. It is operated by JR Kyushu and is on the Nagasaki Main Line.

Lines
Only local trains run on this branch.

Station layout 
The station consists of a side platform serving a single track. The station building is a timber structure and is unstaffed, housing only a waiting area, an automatic ticket vending machine and a SUGOCA card reader. A ramp leads from the station building to the platform. In the past, the platform track was on a siding and trains stopping at the station used to have to perform a switchback manoeuvre to enter and leave. This has been discontinued with the new platform built on the main track but the remnants of the switches and tracks used in the switchback can still be seen.

Adjacent stations

History
On 1 June 1952, the facility was upgraded to a full passenger station. At the same time, the reading of the station name was changed from Hongawachi to Honkawachi, with no change to the corresponding kanji. The section serving Honkawachi which ran from Kikitsu through Nagayo to Urakami became known as the old line or the Nagayo branch. With the privatization of JNR on 1 April 1987, control of the station passed to JR Kyushu.

Passenger statistics
In fiscal 2014, there were a total of 29,561 boarding passengers, giving a daily average of 81 passengers.

Environs
Nagayo Dam
Nagayo Town Araikiri Elementary School

See also
 List of railway stations in Japan

References

External links
Honkawachi Station (JR Kyushu)

Railway stations in Nagasaki Prefecture
Nagasaki Main Line
Railway stations in Japan opened in 1943